This article discusses the portrayal of Salvador Allende on postage stamps.

Allende on stamps
One of the first postage stamps to commemorate Salvador Allende, released after the 1973 coup in Chile, was the Soviet one. It was issued just two months after the event and had a circulation of 3.8 million. The issue was designed by the painter A. Kovrizhkin and bore the title "Salvador Allende, President of the Republic of Chile, Laureate of the Lenin Peace Prize, 1908 - 11.IX.1973".

A stamp was released by Magyar Posta in Hungary in 1974 shortly after the September 11, 1973 coup in Chile that ended the socialist government of Salvador Allende. The stamp bore an image of Allende that had become popular during his election campaign in 1970.

 

Two other stamps, both on the tenth anniversary of the coup, represent extremes of reaction to the event. Scott Cuba #2605 shows the burning presidential palace of La Moneda ("The Mint") and a picture of Allende. The caption refers to him as having "fallen in combat".

In contrast, Chile still under the military dictatorship of General Augusto Pinochet at that time, issued Scott Chile #656, labeled "Ten Years of Liberty", celebrating the decade since the fall of Allende and the rise of the junta.

References and sources
Notes

Sources
 Jack Child, "The Politics and Semiotics of the Smallest Icons of Popular Culture: Latin American Postage Stamps", Latin American Research Review, Vol. 40, no. 1, February 2005.

Postage stamps
Philately of Chile
Cultural depictions of Salvador Allende